Gerald Rushworth Beech (1921 – 2013) was an English architect.

Beech was born in 1921 in Congleton, Cheshire, and educated at the University of Liverpool School of Architecture starting in 1937, and was a staff member there from 1948 to the 1980s.

Beech also ran an architectural practice in Liverpool. Cedarwood, a house he designed with Dewi-Prys Thomas in the Liverpool suburb of Woolton, was named "House of the Year" in 1960 by Woman's Journal. In 1975 he was elected as chairman of the North West Regional Council of the Royal Institute of British Architects.

Beech died in 2013. The Gerald Beech Partnership Papers are held by the University of Liverpool Library.

References

1921 births
2013 deaths
Alumni of the University of Liverpool
Architects from Cheshire